Denver Carlos Snuffer Jr. is a Utah lawyer, an author of Restorationist devotional books, a lecturer, a speculative theologian, and claims to be a “revelator to fellowships of the remnants movement,” a spiritual movement in schism with the Church of Jesus Christ of Latter-day Saints (LDS Church). The movement  has a few thousand adherents, many of them members or former members of the LDS Church. He was excommunicated by the LDS Church in 2013 for refusing to cease publication of his 2011 book, Passing the Heavenly Gift which challenges many points of LDS orthodoxy. He subsequently has been identified as a prophet by many, and several of his teachings have been canonized as scripture.

Biography
Snuffer grew up in a devoutly Baptist household in Mountain Home, Idaho, and in 1973 converted to the LDS Church in New Hampshire during very early adulthood. He received undergraduate degrees from Daniel Webster Junior College and McMurry University and a law degree from the J. Reuben Clark Law School.

Peggy Fletcher Stack, religion columnist for the Salt Lake Tribune, has interpreted Snuffer's main thesis in Passing the Heavenly Gift, to be that "every Mormon prophet, starting with Brigham Young, caved to social, political and legal pressures to accommodate mainstream American society". Snuffer states in the book that he has seen and spoken with Jesus. A 2012 episode of Mormon Stories Podcast described Snuffer as a "progressive, fundamentalist, non-polygamist Mormon lawyer who claims to have seen Christ". Snuffer has characterized this description of him as sensationalized.

Snuffer's book, The Second Comforter: Conversing With the Lord Through the Veil, claims to outline the process for receiving a personal visitation from the resurrected Jesus.

In August 2013, Snuffer's Sandy, Utah, stake president informed him that the continued publication of Passing the Heavenly Gift specifically constituted apostasy since the "book's thesis is in direct conflict with church doctrine." The only way Snuffer could avoid church discipline was to cease its publication and to cancel a planned speaking tour that was thought to be for promoting the ideas expressed in the book. Snuffer's negotiations with his stake president resulted in an impasse—with Snuffer claiming that his stake president received instructions from LDS Church leaders in Salt Lake City to proceed—and he was excommunicated from the church in September 2013. In November 2013, Snuffer said his appeal to the First Presidency of the church to have the excommunication reversed was denied.

Christian fellowships of "the remnants" movement

In the past, Snuffer intended Passing the Heavenly Gift and his other works to promote loyalty to the LDS Church and did not believe he would be instrumental in starting a new denomination. In 2014, Snuffer said that "the Lord terminated the priesthood authority" of all church leadership who were involved in his excommunication, including the First Presidency. Since that time, Snuffer has been at the center of a loosely organized movement who now see him as a prophet. As of 2017, approximately 50 fellowships worldwide have registered on an affiliated website. Fellowships adherents gathered in conferences in 2016 and 2017, the latter of which resulted in Snuffer's teachings being canonized as scripture. The movement's canon now consists of, among other texts, a reworking of scripture from the LDS Church, including the Book of Mormon, Snuffer's expanded translation of the Book of John, and several of Snuffer's own revelations. The movement is notable for a de-emphasis on hierarchy and organization, with some fellowships (for example, the movement's Minnesota fellowship) claiming to have no leadership.

Movement fellowship appears to draw largely from members or former members of the LDS Church, which has led some LDS Church authorities to identify Snuffer and his teachings as a vehicle for leading people out of that church. In 2017, the website MormonLeaks published a PowerPoint presentation that was shown in 2015 to that church's Quorum of the Twelve Apostles. In it, Snuffer was identified as one of 17 "Issues and Ideas Leading People Away" from mainstream LDS doctrine.

In September 2017, Snuffer helped organize the Covenant of Christ Conference in Boise, Idaho, at the Egyptian Theater. The conference voted on the canonization of scripture, and discussed the building of a temple.

Publications
Books
The Second Comforter: Conversing with the Lord Through the Veil (Mill Creek Press, 2006) 
Nephi's Isaiah (Mill Creek Press, 2006) 
Eighteen Verses: A Discussion of the Book of Mormon (Mill Creek Press, 2007) 
Ten Parables (Mill Creek Press, 2008) 
Beloved Enos (Mill Creek Pres, 2009) 
Come, Let Us Adore Him (Mill Creek Press, 2009) 
Removing the Condemnation (Mill Creek Press, 2011) 
Discoveries in Chiasmus - A Pattern in All Things (co-authored, Digital Legend Press, 2011) ASIN B00PV6PB0M
Passing the Heavenly Gift (Mill Creek Press, 2011) 
Remembering the Covenant (5 vols., Mill Creek Press, 2013) 
Essays: Three Degrees (Mill Creek Press, 2014) 
Preserving the Restoration (Mill Creek Press, 2015) 
A Man Without Doubt (Mill Creek Press, 2016) 
Religion of the Fathers: Context for the Book of Abraham (Independent, 2021) 

Selected articles

Revelations and scriptural texts

See also
 Mormonism and history
 September Six

Notes

External links
 Denver C. Snuffer Jr., "Denver Snuffer | Blogs, Books, Papers & Lectures".
 Gregory L. Smith, "Passing Up The Heavenly Gift (Part One of Two): Review of Denver C. Snuffer Jr., Passing the Heavenly Gift", Interpreter: A Journal of Mormon Scripture 7 (2013): 181–243.
 Gregory L. Smith, "Passing Up The Heavenly Gift (Part Two of Two): Review of Denver C. Snuffer Jr., Passing the Heavenly Gift", Interpreter: A Journal of Mormon Scripture 7 (2013): 245–341.
 Russell Y. Anderson, "Snuffer, 'Passing the Heavenly Gift' (reviewed by Russell Y. Anderson)", Association for Mormon Letters Discussion Board
 Julie J. Nichols, "Snuffer, 'Passing the Heavenly Gift' (reviewed by Julie J. Nichols)", Association for Mormon Letters Discussion Board
 

Living people
Converts to Mormonism from Baptist denominations
Mormonism-related controversies
People from Sandy, Utah
American Latter Day Saint writers
People excommunicated by the Church of Jesus Christ of Latter-day Saints
Utah lawyers
Writers from Utah
Daniel Webster College alumni
McMurry University alumni
J. Reuben Clark Law School alumni
Prophets in Mormonism
Year of birth missing (living people)